Do Sang-woo (born December 25, 1987) is a South Korean actor and model. Do has been gaining attention after starring as Gong Hyo-jin's character's ex-boyfriend in the television series It's Okay, That's Love (2014). He enlisted to the army on April 5, 2016.

Filmography

Television series

Television show

Awards and nominations

References

External links 
 Official website 

1987 births
Living people
South Korean male models
South Korean male television actors
People from Busan